The Islamic City Council of Tehran is the directly elected council that presides over the city of Tehran, elects the mayor of Tehran in a mayor–council government system, and budgets of the Municipality of Tehran.

The council is composed of twenty one members elected on a plurality-at-large voting basis for four-year terms. The chairman and the deputy chairman of the council are chosen by the council at the first regular meeting in odd-numbered years.

It holds regular meetings on Sunday, Tuesday and Wednesday at 10 am (except on holidays or if decided by special resolution not to meet).

History

Persian Constitutional Revolution passed a law on local governance known as “Ghanoon-e Baladieh”. The second and third articles of the law, on “anjoman-e baladieh”, or the city council, provide a detailed outline on issues such as the role of the councils in the city, the members’ qualifications, the election process, and the requirements to be entitled to vote. Baladieh, or the modern municipality in Iran was established in 1910, to cope with the growing need for the transformation of Tehran's city structures.

After the First World War, Reza Shah, the founder of the Pahlavi dynasty, immediately suspended the “Ghanoon-e Baladieh” of 1907 and the decentralized and autonomous city councils were replaced by centralist/sectoralist approaches of governance and planning.

Members

Previous members

Chairpersons

Composition

Election results

Timeline

Mayors elected

References

External links
 Islamic City Council of Tehran, the council's website (in Persian)

Government of Tehran
Tehran
1999 establishments in Iran